Ings is a village in the South Lakeland district of Cumbria, England.

Ings is located in the parish of Hugill, historically a part of Westmorland. The Grade II*-listed St Anne's Church is located within the village.

See also

Listed buildings in Hugill

References

External links
 Cumbria County History Trust: Hugill (nb: provisional research only – see Talk page)

Villages in Cumbria
South Lakeland District